Tambo de Mora District is one of eleven districts of the province Chincha in Peru.

References

1875 establishments in Peru